An adaptive switch is a network switch designed to normally operate in cut-through mode but if a port's error rate jumps too high, the switch automatically reconfigures the port to run in store-and-forward mode. This optimizes the switch's performance by providing higher speed cut-through switching if error rates are low but higher throughput store-and-forward switching when error rates are high.

Adaptive switching is typically done on a port-by-port basis.

References

Networking hardware